Stephen is a masculine given name.

Stephen may also refer to:

People
 Stephen (surname), including a list of people with the surname
 Stephen (honorific), a South Slavic medieval honorific

Places
 Stephen, Minnesota, United States
 Mount Stephen, a mountain in British Columbia

Music
 "Stephen", a 1976 song by Neil Sedaka
 "Stephen", a 2010 song by Veronica Falls
 "Stephen" (song), a 2010 song by Kesha
 "Stephen, Stephen", a song by The Apples in Stereo

Television
Stephen (TV series), a 2021 British television series based on the racist murder of Stephen Lawrence

See also
 List of people with given name Stephen
 Stefen
 Stephan (disambiguation)
 Stephens (disambiguation)
 Stevens (disambiguation)
 Steve (disambiguation)
 Steve O. (disambiguation)
 Stevo (disambiguation)
 Stephanie (disambiguation)
 Stephania (disambiguation)